REMIXXXX is an album by You Say Party (formerly You Say Party! We Say Die!), released on September 21, 2010 by Paper Bag Digital. REMIXXXX is a reworking of their previous album XXXX.

Track listing
 “Dark Days (CFCF Mix)”
 “Dark Days (Teen Daze Mix)”
 “There is XXXX (Within My Heart) (Mathemagic Mix)”
 “There is XXXX (Within My Heart) (Beckwith and Tombstone Mix)”
 “Laura Palmer’s Prom (Johan Agebjörn Mix)”
 “Laura Palmer’s Prom (Los Campesinos Mix)”
 “Dark Days (Babe Rainbow Mix)”
 “Dark Days (LandscapeBodyMachine Mix)”
 “There is XXXX (Within My Heart) (SkullKrushers Mix)”
 “There is XXXX (Within My Heart) (Teen Daze Mix)”

2010 albums
You Say Party albums
Paper Bag Records albums